Parsonsite is a lead uranium phosphate mineral with chemical formula: Pb2(UO2)(PO4)2·2H2O. Parsonsite contains about 45% lead and 25% uranium. It forms elongated lathlike pseudo monoclinic crystals, radial spherulites, encrustations and powdery aggregates. It is of a light yellow colour.  It has a Mohs hardness of 2.5-3 and a specific gravity of 5.72 - 6.29.

It was first described in 1923 for an occurrence in the Shinkolobwe mine, Katanga Copper Crescent, Democratic Republic of Congo. It was named for mineralogist Arthur Leonard Parsons (1873–1957) of the University of Toronto, Canada.

References

Bibliography
Palache, P.; Berman H.; Frondel, C. (1960). "Dana's System of Mineralogy, Volume II: Halides, Nitrates, Borates, Carbonates, Sulfates, Phosphates, Arsenates, Tungstates, Molybdates, Etc. (Seventh Edition)" John Wiley and Sons, Inc., New York, pp. 913-914.

Uranium(VI) minerals
Phosphate minerals
Triclinic minerals
Lead minerals
Minerals in space group 2